Léon Frédéric Gustave Delacroix (27 December 1867 – 15 October 1929) was a Belgian statesman. Before entering politics, he was a renowned lawyer, and served as president of the Belgian Court of Cassation from 1917 to 1918. In the context of reconstruction after World War I, he was appointed the prime minister and served from 1918 to 1920. During his term, universal suffrage for men was enacted. He was also the minister of Finance from 1918 to 1920.

External links 
 Léon Delacroix in ODIS - Online Database for Intermediary Structures 

1867 births
1929 deaths
Belgian Ministers of State
Catholic Party (Belgium) politicians
Finance ministers of Belgium
People from Saint-Josse-ten-Noode
Prime Ministers of Belgium
Court of Cassation (Belgium) judges